Hervé Tchami (born 20 February 1988) is a Cameroonian professional footballer, who last played as a winger for Düzkaya KOSK and the Cameroon national team.

Club career
Tchami was born in Fopounga, Cameroon.

On 17 August 2016, Tchami signed for C.D. Feirense.

On 17 January 2018, Keşla FK announced the signing of Tchami on a one-year contract.

Personal life
Tchami is from a family of footballers. His three older brothers also played professionally: Alphonse, a former Cameroon international, Bertrand, a former Grenoble and Reims player, and Joël.

References

External links

Hervé Tchami at KTFF

1988 births
Living people
Cameroonian footballers
Cameroon international footballers
Association football wingers
Hertha BSC players
Hamburger SV players
Szolnoki MÁV FC footballers
Budapest Honvéd FC players
Zagłębie Sosnowiec players
MFK Karviná players
Pogoń Szczecin players
IFK Värnamo players
C.D. Feirense players
USM Bel Abbès players
Hajer FC players
Al-Orouba SC players
Giresunspor footballers
Shamakhi FK players
Superettan players
Nemzeti Bajnokság I players
Nemzeti Bajnokság II players
Primeira Liga players
Saudi First Division League players
Ekstraklasa players
Algerian Ligue Professionnelle 1 players
TFF First League players
Czech National Football League players
Azerbaijan Premier League players
Cameroonian expatriate footballers
Expatriate footballers in Germany
Expatriate footballers in Poland
Expatriate footballers in the Czech Republic
Expatriate footballers in Hungary
Expatriate footballers in Sweden
Expatriate footballers in Algeria
Expatriate footballers in Oman
Expatriate footballers in Turkey
Expatriate footballers in Portugal
Expatriate footballers in Azerbaijan
Expatriate footballers in Saudi Arabia
Expatriate footballers in Cyprus
Cameroonian expatriate sportspeople in Germany
Cameroonian expatriate sportspeople in Poland
Cameroonian expatriate sportspeople in the Czech Republic
Cameroonian expatriate sportspeople in Hungary
Cameroonian expatriate sportspeople in Sweden
Cameroonian expatriate sportspeople in Algeria
Cameroonian expatriate sportspeople in Oman
Cameroonian expatriate sportspeople in Turkey
Cameroonian expatriate sportspeople in Portugal
Cameroonian expatriate sportspeople in Saudi Arabia
Cameroonian expatriate sportspeople in Azerbaijan